is a private Christian girls' secondary school in , Kita, Tokyo. It is a part of the Seigakuin educational group.

In 1905 the school was established.

References

External links
 Joshi Seigakuin Junior & Senior High School 

Private schools in Tokyo
Junior high schools in Japan
High schools in Tokyo
Girls' schools in Japan
Christian schools in Japan